The Senior Courts Act 2016 (Public Act 2016 No 48) is an Act of the Parliament of New Zealand which governs the High Court, the Court of Appeal and the Supreme Court of New Zealand. It was passed by the New Zealand House of Representatives on 11 October 2016 as part of a judiciary modernisation package and received royal assent on 17 October 2016. One of its purposes was to replace and consolidate in a single statute the Judicature Act 1908 and the Supreme Court Act 2003, which were repealed.

References

External links
 Text of the Act

2016 in New Zealand
Law of New Zealand
Statutes of New Zealand